Rosaire Allen Moschitto (born February 15, 1945 in Fresno, California) is a former Major League Baseball player. He batted and threw right-handed.

He was signed by the Yankees as an amateur free agent in 1964. Moschitto is only one of seven players to have more career game appearances than plate appearances.

References

External links

1945 births
Living people
Major League Baseball outfielders
New York Yankees players
Baseball players from California
Sportspeople from Fresno, California